Obinna Kelvin Anyanwu (born in Port Harcourt, Rivers State, Nigeria), better known by stage name Waconzy, is a singer, songwriter, record producer and philanthropist with family roots in Umuahia, Abia State. He is the founder of Dv8 Media and the Waconzy Foundation. He rose to prominence in 2010 with his song "I Celebrate" which appeared on the I Celebrate album. His second album Money Back Guarantee was released in 2013. He is currently signed to Dv8 Media.

Early life
Waconzy was born on 10 August 1983 in Port Harcourt and completed his primary and secondary education there. In 1998, he recorded his first song while he was still in high school. In 2000, Waconzy gained admission into the Federal University of Technology Owerri and graduated in 2005 with a bachelor of technology degree in project management. After completing his NYSC service in 2006, Waconzy joined the Project Management Institute in the United States where he was certified a Project Management Professional (PMP) and, in 2008, he set up his company Dv8 Media.

Career
In 2008 Waconzy released the single "I Celebrate". The song's music video was shot by Clarence Peters of CAPital Dream Pictures in Lagos, Nigeria. In 2011, Waconzy collaborated with Duncan Mighty for the remix of "I Celebrate".

He released his debut album I Celebrate in 2010. The album included the singles "I Celebrate", "Too Much Money", "Wedding Day" and "Chuku Chuku".

Following his debut album, Waconzy released his album Money Back Guarantee in 2013 which featured the songs "Amosu", "Club on Fire" and "Sweet like Tombo". In 2015, he released the Waconzy Greatest Hits compilation album which featured the songs "Na God", "Balling like Waconzy (Ekpoh)" and "Ogbono".

Waconzy has made charitable contributions in Nigeria. He helped feed over a thousand poor people and kicked off the Waconzy versus Malaria Zero Tolerance campaign to fight malaria in Africa.

Waconzy has collaborated with Banky W. ("Jangolova"), Faze ("Champion"), Duncan Mighty ("I Celebrate" remix), Naeto C ("Hallelujah" remix) and Truth Hurts ("Club on Fire" remix).

World tours and notable performances

World Tours
Hottest Naija Boy Alive Tour (Europe Tour) in 2014 where he was spotted with Sean Combs.

Notable performances
MTN on the Power of Ten Concert (2011)
Calabar Carnival (2013)
Caribbean African American Awards (2013)
MTN Loud In Naija Tour (2013)
Hennessey Artistry Tour (2013)

Discography

Singles
"Ikebe super"
"I Celebrate"
"Hallelujah"
"Jangolova" (featuring Banky W.)
"Fine Fine Girl"
"Jogodo"
"Club on Fire"
"Oh No (I CRY)"
"Amosu"
"Sweet Like Tombo" (featuring Chimaga)
"Club on Fire (Remix)" (featuring Truth Hurts)
"My Money Dey Talk" (featuring Chimaga)
"Champion" (featuring Faze)
"Ekpoh"
"Ogbono"
"Na God"
"Am Sorry"
"Amosu (Remix)" (featuring Rhage, Heyden Adama & Shadow Boxxer)
"Pitakwa"
"Nothing Last Forever"
"Let Me Love you"
"Apple Of My Eyes"

Albums
I Celebrate (2010)
Money Back Guarantee (2013)
Waconzy: Greatest Hits (2015)

Awards and nominations

Awarded

At the 2013 6th Annual World Music and Independent Film Festival in Hollywood, Waconzy was honoured with a humanitarian award for his contribution to the fight against malaria in Africa through his 'Waconzy Versus Malaria Zero Tolerance' campaign.

See also
List of Nigerian musicians
List of people from Port Harcourt

References

External links

Living people
Nigerian male pop singers
21st-century Nigerian male  singers
Federal University of Technology Owerri alumni
Singers from Port Harcourt
Songwriters from Rivers State
1983 births
Nigerian male singer-songwriters
Nigerian hip hop singers
Musicians from Rivers State
Musicians from Abia State
Nigerian music industry executives